A New Leaf is a 1971 American black comedy film written and directed by Elaine May in her directorial debut based on the short story "The Green Heart" by Jack Ritchie. It stars May, Walter Matthau, Jack Weston, George Rose, James Coco, and Doris Roberts. Prior to the film, May was better known for her collaboration as a stage comedian with The Graduate director Mike Nichols. For this film, May consulted Dr. Dominick Basile, a botany professor at Columbia University. Dr. Basile wrote botanically accurate lines into the script and supplied the botanical equipment seen in the film. May also modeled Henrietta's office after his.

The film was a critical success upon its initial release. However, despite several accolades, award nominations, and a Radio City Music Hall run, A New Leaf fared poorly at the box office and remains little known by the general public. It is now considered a cult classic. In 2019, the film was selected by the Library of Congress for preservation in the United States National Film Registry for being "culturally, historically, or aesthetically significant".

Plot
Henry Graham, a playboy from a wealthy patrician family, has run through his entire inheritance and is completely unequipped to provide for himself, with his greedy uncle Harry refusing to lend him any more money. His valet Harold suggests to a suicidal Henry that he should marry into wealth. With a $50,000 loan from Harry to tide him over, Henry has just six weeks to find a rich bride and repay the money, otherwise he must forfeit all of his property to his uncle.

Desperation sets in as Henry's attempts to meet a suitable mate fail. With only days remaining, Henry meets clumsy, painfully shy heiress Henrietta Lowell, a botany professor. She is the answer to his prayers: wealthy and with no family. However, Henrietta's suspicious (and crooked) lawyer Andy McPherson is a problem, as Harry plots with him to prove to Henrietta that Henry only wants her for her money. They fail, and Henrietta marries Henry. On their honeymoon, Henrietta discovers what may be an unknown species of fern.

Murder never far from his mind, Henry takes charge of his wife's life. He reorganizes her household staff, who had been taking full advantage of her timidity and naivete and sharing their profits with her former lawyer. He also learns how to manage accounts and a vast estate. Henrietta is completely disorganized and welcomes Henry's guidance. She also finds out that he has a B.A. in history, and suggests that an unwilling Henry could get a teaching job at the university she works at, so they could be together all the time.

When Henrietta's fern is confirmed as a new species, she names it Alsophila grahami after Henry. She invites him to join her on her canoe trip to the Adirondacks for her annual field trip. Henry sees this as an opportunity to rid himself of Henrietta in a remote area with no witnesses. Before he can dispose of her, however, their canoe capsizes. Henry makes it to shore, but Henrietta tells him she cannot swim. Henry tells her to let go of the log she is clinging to and he will rescue her. As he is leaving her to her watery fate, he finds an example of the fern Henrietta named after him. Realizing that he loves her, he rescues her and resigns himself to his unexpected fate as a married man, vowing that he will always be there to take care of her.

Cast
 Walter Matthau as Henry Graham
 Elaine May as Henrietta Lowell
 Jack Weston as Andy McPherson
 George Rose as Harold
 James Coco as Uncle Harry
 Doris Roberts as Mrs. Traggert
 Renée Taylor as Sally Hart
 David Doyle as Mel
 William Redfield as Beckett
 Mark Gordon as John

Production
May wrote A New Leaf from Ritchie's short story, but she never intended to act in or direct the picture. She was originally offered $200,000 for the script, but her agent cut a deal with Paramount so that May could direct and he could produce. She was paid only $50,000, as her agent told her a first time director could not expect such a large sum of money.

May was told that she could not get the picture made without Matthau, and that Paramount wanted Carol Channing to play the part of Henrietta. May protested, saying it was the man's movie and that the woman had to be someone who disappeared. She asked if she could pick the actress, and the studio declined, saying that instead, May could play Henrietta, and all for the same money.

A New Leaf was filmed in both Maine and multiple sections of New York City, including Lutèce restaurant on 50th Street in Manhattan and the interchange between the Long Island Expressway and Cross Island Parkway in the Oakland Gardens section of Queens.

It was co-produced by Aries Productions and Elkins Productions International Corporation, whose only other production was A Doll's House (1973).

Financial issues
In what would become a hallmark of Elaine May, the film's original $1.8 million budget shot up to over $4 million by the time it was completed. Shooting went 40 days over schedule and editing took over ten months. Similar problems dogged her subsequent projects, Mikey and Nicky and Ishtar, the latter being one of the worst films ever made.

During shooting, producer Howard W. Koch tried to have May replaced, but she had put a $200,000 (equivalent to $ million in ) penalty clause in her contract and he was persuaded to keep her.

Alternate versions
After May would not show Paramount Pictures a rough cut of the film ten months into editing, Robert Evans took the film away from her and recut it even though she had final cut in her contract. May's version was rumored to run 180 minutes and contained the two murders in Ritchie's story, as well as subplots about misogyny. It is not known if the original cut still exists. Evans shortened it to 102 minutes. Angered by the alterations, May tried to take her name off the film and unsuccessfully sued Paramount to keep it from being released.

The original story included a subplot in which Henry discovers from the household accounts that Henrietta is being blackmailed on dubious grounds by the lawyer, McPherson, and another character played by William Hickey; Henry poisons both of them. This darkly casts Henry's eventual acceptance of a conventional life with Henrietta as his "sentence". Paramount eliminated this subplot.

May sued Paramount to get her name removed as writer and director, but no one with power was on her side. Matthau never thought her capable of holding all three roles of actor, director, and writer, and the judge eventually sided with Paramount, saying their version was hilarious and bound to be a hit.
Roger Ebert discusses this issue in his review: "Miss May is reportedly dissatisfied with the present version; newspaper reports indicate that her original cut was an hour longer and included two murders. Matthau, who likes this version better than the original, has suggested that writer-director-stars should be willing to let someone else have a hand in the editing. Maybe so. I'm generally prejudiced in favor of the director in these disputes. Whatever the merits of Miss May's case, however, the movie in its present form is hilarious, and cockeyed, and warm."

Vincent Canby remarked: "Not having seen Miss May's version, I can only say that the film I saw should be a credit to almost any director, though, theoretically at least, Miss May is right. The only thing that gives me pause is the knowledge that its success will probably be used in the future as an argument to ignore the intentions of other directors, but with far less happy results."

Release

Critical reception
The film was well received by critics. On review aggregator Rotten Tomatoes, the film holds an approval rating of 94% based on 68 reviews, with an average score of 8.10/10. The website's critical consensus reads, "Elaine May is a comedic dynamo both behind and in front of the camera in this viciously funny screwball farce, with able support provided by Walter Matthau."

Roger Ebert gave the film four stars out of four, and described the film as "hilarious, and cockeyed, and warm." In his review for The New York Times, Vincent Canby called it "a beautifully and gently cockeyed movie that recalls at least two different traditions of American film comedy... The entire project is touched by a fine and knowing madness." The film was placed at #2 on Gene Siskel's list of the best movies of 1971.

Awards

See also

 List of films cut over the director's opposition
 1971 in film
 Cactus Flower (film)
The Heartbreak Kid - May's 1972 follow-up film

References

External links

1970s black comedy films
1971 romantic comedy films
1971 films
American black comedy films
American romantic comedy films
Films about marriage
Films based on short fiction
Films directed by Elaine May
Films scored by Neal Hefti
Films set in New York (state)
Films shot in New York City
Films shot in Maine
Paramount Pictures films
Films with screenplays by Elaine May
Uxoricide in fiction
United States National Film Registry films
1971 directorial debut films
1971 drama films
1970s English-language films
1970s American films